Hayrullah Bilazer (born 20 May 1995) is a Turkish professional footballer who plays as a right-back for Giresunspor.

Professional career
A youth product of Trabzon Söğütlüspor and Akçaabat Sebatspor, Bilazer began his senior career with Trabzon Kanuni. He had stints with Darıca Gençlerbirliği and Boluspor thereafter. On 19 August 2020, he transferred to Giresunspor and helped them achieve promotion into the Süper Lig. He made his professional debut with Giresunspor in a 2–0 Süper Lig loss to Galatasaray on 16 August 2021.

References

External links
 
 
 

1995 births
Living people
Sportspeople from Trabzon
Turkish footballers
Darıca Gençlerbirliği footballers
Boluspor footballers
Giresunspor footballers
Süper Lig players
TFF First League players
Association football fullbacks